Roy Elmer Lamb (August 20, 1899 – December 21, 1995) was an American football player for the Rock Island Independents and Chicago Cardinals. He played college football for Lombard College.

References

1899 births
1995 deaths
People from Butler County, Nebraska
Players of American football from Nebraska
American football quarterbacks
Rock Island Independents players
Chicago Cardinals players